WSIZ-FM 102.3 FM is a radio station licensed to Jacksonville, Georgia. The station broadcasts a classic hits format and is owned by Middle Georgia Community Radio

References

External links

SIZ-FM
Classic hits radio stations in the United States